Black Home is a 2015 Hindi social drama thriller film produced by Shri Vijay Kamble and co-produced by Mahesh R. Salunke under the banner Samajik Samata Manch Film Company. The film is written & directed by Ashish Deo. It's a research based film inspired by true incidents with lot of information from media, news papers and real life interviews of Remand Home girls to understand the intensity of the subject. The music for the film is scored by Akshay Hariharan and lyrics are penned by Sahil Sultanpuri. The soundtrack was released in September 2013. Akshay Hariharan, son of noted Tamil singer Hariharan debuted in this film.

Plot
Rajawadi Remand Home is in lot of controversy because of many illegal activities. DK a news channel bureau chief is all over it again and wants to bring the facts out. He is surrounded with channel politics. He uses a non-performing female journalist Anjali to expose the racket and the dark side of the society shows its ugly face. It unfolds so many cruel realities of the crime & politics, which we consistently ignore. System is not so easy to expose.

The film attempts to highlight the harsh situations faced by kids in remand homes.

Development
Juvenile Act is implied for the betterment of children's future. But unfortunately the reality is unimaginable. The child, who comes to the remand home, is not criminal always. It is most of the time an unwanted child of the house or the parents are poor to raise this child.

This film is a sincere effort to reveal the reality of these remand home girls in front of the society and make the society aware of the facts that these children lead a life worse than hell. We are part of this society, where we live a very secure life but the other side of the society is very dark, like a BLACK HOME.

Issues highlighted
  India stands 3rd in the world for rape.
  Every 20 min a girl is raped in India.
  5 lakh children are forced into sex trade every year.
  Out of 12 million girls born in India, 1 million girls do not see their first birthday.

Cast
 Ashutosh Rana
 Chitrashi Rawat
 Ashmita 
 Murli Sharma 
  Simran Sehmi
  Sharad Ponkshe
 Achint Kaur
 Amit Behl
 Mohan Joshi
 Santosh Juvekar
 Raju Kher
 Neelu Kohli

Credits

Banner: Samajik Samata Manch Film Company

Producer: Vijay Kamble

Co producer: Mahesh R. Salunke

Story, Screenplay, Dialogues & Direction: Ashish Deo

Line Producer: Salim Khultabadkar

Music Director: Akshay Hariharan

Lyricist: Sahil Sultanpuri 

Singers: Asha Bhosle, A. Hariharan, Suraj Jagan

Cinematographer: Shailesh Awasthi

Action: Allan Amin

Editor: Anand Diwan

Choreography: Swarup Medara

Background Music: Amar Mohile

Art Director: Deepak Chakrabarty

PRO : Prem Jhangiyani, Pradnya Shetty

Music

References

External links
 
 

2015 films
2010s Hindi-language films
Films about prostitution in India
Films about women in India